Homerton College is a constituent college of the University of Cambridge. Its first premises were acquired in Homerton, London in 1768, by an informal gathering of Protestant dissenters with origins in the seventeenth century. In 1894, the college moved from Homerton High Street, Hackney, London, to Cambridge. Homerton was admitted as an "Approved Society" of the university in 1976, and received its Royal charter in 2010, affirming its status as a full college of the university. The college celebrated its 250th anniversary in 2018.

With around 600 undergraduates, 800 postgraduates, and 90 fellows, it has more students than any other Cambridge college but, because only half of those are resident undergraduates, its undergraduate presence is similar to large colleges such as Trinity and St John's. The college has particularly strong ties to public service, as well as academia, having educated many prominent dissenting thinkers, educationalists, politicians, and missionary explorers.

The college has extensive grounds which encompass sports fields, water features and beehives, and the focal point of the college, its Victorian Gothic hall. It also has a wide range of student clubs and societies, including Homerton College Boat Club, Homerton College Music Society and the Homerton College Rugby Football Club.

History

Early history

The college's origins date back to the seventeenth century. In 1695, a Congregation Fund was created in London to educate Calvinist ministers. As non-conformists, they were barred by law from attending Oxbridge colleges, and so studied a modern curriculum, with particular emphasis on philosophy, science, and modern history. In 1730, a formal society – known as the King's Head Society after the pub at the Royal Exchange where they held their meetings – was founded to sponsor young men to attend dissenting academies. Today, a secret society and discussion club at the college of the same name maintains some of its traditions. By 1768, the Society was large enough to need its own premises, so it purchased a large property in Homerton High Street, in London's East End.

By 1817, the institution had become known as "Homerton Academy Society", later "Homerton College Society". At that time, it produced some of the nation's foremost dissenting figures, many closely involved in the movements opposed to the slave trade and the Corn Laws. For several years, the college was affiliated to the University of London, but when its theological function was moved to New College London in 1850, it was re-founded by the Congregational Board of Education to concentrate on the study of education itself. It did so by transferring its theological courses to New College London, of which the Rev. John Harris DD was the Congregationalist Principal, and by extending and rebuilding the old mansion house and 1820s buildings of the academy, at a cost of £10,000. The college reopened in April 1852 as the Training Institution of the Congregational Board of Education, with Samuel Morley as its treasurer. Shortly afterwards, it began admitting women students. Then Principal John Horobin called an end to mixed education in 1896, shortly after the move to Cambridge, and the college remained all-women for 80 years thereafter.

Towards the end of the century, the growth of industry had turned the village of Homerton into a manufacturing centre, lowering the quality of life of the students and, between 1878 and 1885, there were seven deaths from tuberculosis, smallpox and typhoid. At the same time, increasing numbers of students required more space.

In 1881, former students of Homerton College who were members of Glyn Cricket Club formed a football section to help keep their players fit during the winter months. The football section continued to grow over the ensuing years and is now Leyton Orient Football Club – a fact acknowledged by an annual match between the college's football team and that of the Leyton Orient Supporters Club.

Move to Cambridge
In 1894, the Congregational Board of Education were able to purchase the estate of Cavendish College, Cambridge (named after the then-Chancellor of the university and not to be confused with Lucy Cavendish College) which had become available. It had been founded to allow poorer students to sit Cambridge tripos exams without the expense of joining a true Cambridge college. It was briefly recognised as a "Public Hostel" of the university in 1882, but a lack of money had brought the venture to an end.

All its estates and furniture were bought for £10,000 by the Congregational Board, and students and staff moved from the old Hackney premises into the vacant college buildings at Cambridge. Initially taking the name of Homerton New College at Cavendish College, it shortly afterwards became just Homerton College, Cambridge. John Charles Horobin became the first Principal: his portrait hangs in the college's Great Hall.

The first woman to head the college was Mary Miller Allan, who was responsible for Homerton's national reputation as a trainer of women teachers. Her successor in 1935 was Miss Alice Skillicorn, a former HMI, who took the college through World War Two, during which time it was bombed. Dame Beryl Paston Brown was Principal in the 1960s, at a time when Homerton's numbers doubled after the introduction of three-year training courses in 1960.

In December 1976, under the headship of Principal Alison Cheveley Shrubsole, Homerton was accepted as an Approved Society of the University of Cambridge following a 3–1 vote of the Regent House in favour of its admission. The possibility of introducing a Cambridge Bachelor of Education (BEd) degree had been given as one of the reasons for the original move into Cambridge. It was after the shake-up and governmental criticisms of teacher training in the early 1970s that the university admitted Homerton because, by then, all of its students were doing four-year honours courses.

In late 2000, the Regent House approved a proposal to "converge" Homerton with the rest of the university. Convergence involved the transfer of most of the college's teaching and research activity to the new University of Cambridge Faculty of Education and the diversification of the college into a wide range of Tripos subjects. In September 2001, Homerton admitted its first non-education Tripos students. At the same time the old BEd degree was retired in favour of a three-year B.A. in Education, followed by a one-year Post Graduate Certificate of Education.

At the time of convergence, it was envisaged that Homerton would move from the status of Approved Society to that of Approved Foundation or full college. In December 2008 Homerton's application to move to full college status was approved by the University Council. The change in status was completed with the grant of a Royal Charter on 11 March 2010.

Buildings and grounds

The original Victorian Cavendish College buildings were constructed in 1876 in the Gothic Revival style, using a combination of red Suffolk brick and Bath stone dressings. One of the most notable features is an oak doorway with an ogee arch flanked above by ornamental grotesques. Several years later, the Cambridge architect William Wren designed additions to the eastern end of the college buildings in the Neo-Gothic style – now occupied by the Principal's office. The castellated tower is the tallest part of the original college buildings, and it is possible to see the spires of Ely Cathedral on a clear day from its uppermost floor.

The Great Hall is one of the largest and grandest dining halls in Cambridge. When it was built in 1889 it was the largest college hall in Cambridge. It now houses one of the college's most notable works of art – the celebrated Pre-Raphaelite piece by Jane Benham Hay known as 'The Florentine Procession', painted in the 1860s and winning 'Picture of the Year' in the 1867 Saturday Review. Also encircling the Hall are portraits of former Principals of the college. The Hall itself features a hammer-beam roof, American walnut panelling, a gallery, rose windows, a fleche, and a bell originating from the old college in London which sounds before the College Grace is read at Formal dinner. A new dining hall was designed by Feilden Fowles and opened in 2022; Rowan Moore named it as one of his five best buildings of the year.

Other notable buildings of the college include the Ibberson Building built in 1914 (named after its architect, Herbert George Ibberson) which is considered by many – including Nikolaus Pevsner in his Buildings of England – to be the college's most significant building; a fact mirrored by its Grade Two listed status, the only listed building on the site. An example of arts and crafts style architecture, its present-day Combination Room was probably the only grade two listed gymnasium in the world. Also of interest is Trumpington House (completed in 1847, and which once held the college's wine collection in its basement) built in the style of classical revival and currently leased to the Faculty of Education.

Like the majority of Cambridge colleges, Homerton offers on-site accommodation for its students for all three years. This is provided by four purpose-built accommodation buildings: East House, West House, South Court (the latest addition to the college, opened in 2007), and Harrison House. Harrison House exclusively houses graduate students and fellows, and was opened in November 2006. Harrison House is named after Sir David Harrison.  Other accommodation is provided in the ABC and D&E blocks, both part of the main college buildings, as well as in Queen's Wing (opened by Queen Elizabeth the Queen Mother in 1957) which also contains the Homerton Union of Students and both the Undergraduate and Graduate Common Rooms. Outside of university terms, the accommodation attracts extensive use for conference purposes. 

Like the other colleges of the university, Homerton's library includes thousands of books covering numerous academic disciplines. Unique to Homerton, however, is a children's book collection, which contains early editions of many famous books from 1780 onwards.

Homerton has more green space around its buildings than many other Cambridge colleges. In its grounds are several rare examples of wild orchids and over 150 species of plants, which act as a rich habitat for various forms of wildlife – including grey squirrels, carrion crows, woodpeckers, stock doves, rabbits, the 'College fox', and in the summer a small colony of swifts, which nest under the eaves of the roof of the Cavendish building after their return from Africa. There is also a large orchard, where students relax in warm weather.

Student life

Traditions

Homerton has several unique traditions. At its Matriculation Dinner new undergraduates are made to form two lines and drink wine from the 'Homerton Horn' – an African cow horn with silver mounts, whilst speaking several Anglo-Saxon phrases to one another (including the greeting "Wassail!", and the response "Frith and Freondship sae th'y'" – 'peace and friendship be with you'). In recent years, the tradition has been adapted so that undergraduates say these Anglo-Saxon phrases to the person sat across from them on the table, and take subsequent drinks from their own glasses, rather than every undergraduate drinking from the ceremonial horn, which has historically resulted in epidemics of 'Freshers Flu'.

Because the college was all-female for much of its history, the design of the college gown is that of those traditionally worn by female undergraduates in early twentieth century Cambridge (this is shared by all the historically-female colleges: Girton, Newnham, and Murray Edwards).  The gown is based on the original Cambridge black gown, still worn by undergraduates at Peterhouse, but has the slits in the sleeves closed up.  As a homage to its all-female origins, or simply because the college has never had one re-designed, this gown is now worn by all undergraduates at the college regardless of sex.

Homerton Union of Students 
The Homerton Union of Students is one of the most active student unions in the university. The President - the only paid, sabbatical Presidency of all the Cambridge colleges - manages, along with a Vice-President Internal and a Vice President External, a team of students on the executive committee and a team of 'Liberation officers'. Together, they organise 'Freshers Week'. Homerton's Fresher's week is longer than in most colleges, where students only have two to three days of 'Freshers week' before the start of term. They also organise events throughout the year for students, as well as offer pastoral support.

Every year, the union organises Harry Potter formals, which take place in the college's Great Hall, and include real owls.

May Ball
The college holds an annual May Ball in Cambridge. In 2018, the ball was attended by over 1500 guests, the largest ever hosted on Homerton's grounds, to celebrate the college's 250th anniversary.

Boat Club
Homerton College Boat Club (HCBC) is the rowing club of the college. HCBC colours are navy blue with white trim, although the club's Zephyr (garment) is white with blue trim. The blade colour is white with a single blue (RAL-290-20-30) vertical stripe. It is traditional to wear a sock of each of the boat club's colours when racing with a blue sock on the foot opposite the rigger.

The Men's 1st VIII hold the Oxbridge record for the most places advanced during one series of bumps (either Mays, Lents, or Torpids/Eights for Oxford), advancing 13 places in the May Bumps 2001, where the crew moved up a division to division 3 and also won blades.

Widening Participation 
In 2022, Homerton made offers to five students, who are among more than 50 candidates from backgrounds of educational disadvantage to be offered a place on the University of Cambridge’s first-ever pre-degree foundation year.

People associated with Homerton 

Principals, treasurers, fellows (including honorary fellows) or students who studied at Homerton Academy or Homerton College before and after it officially became part of Cambridge University. Graduates of the college are collectively known as Homertonians.

Principals 
A list of Homerton principals since the college moved to Cambridge in 1894:

References

Further reading
 
 
 Warner, Dr Peter. Lecture on the history of Homerton College (Michaelmas term 2004)

External links 

 Homerton College website
 Homerton College JCR website
 Homerton College MCR website (Graduate Society)

 
Educational institutions established in 1976
Colleges of the University of Cambridge
History of the London Borough of Hackney
1976 establishments in England
Teacher training colleges in the United Kingdom